Rage Valley is the second EP by the Australian electro house duo Knife Party. It was released 27 May 2012 on Beatport and on 3 June 2012 on iTunes. The title track was originally named "Fuck Em" but was changed for what Knife Party described as "secret shady" reasons. Originally Rage Valley was set to be released before the end of April, but due to multiple setbacks the release was delayed for four weeks. A music video for "Centipede" was released on 8 August 2012. An edited version of the track "Bonfire" was featured in the episode "Fifty-One" of Breaking Bad and the video game WWE 2K15, and "Centipede" was featured in the fourth episode of the BBC comedy series The Wrong Mans.

Track listing

References

2012 EPs
Knife Party EPs
Big Beat Records (American record label) EPs